The Manuscript  (often stylized The MANuscript) is a studio album by American singer Dave Hollister. It was released by Shanachie Records in collaboration with Conjunction Entertainment and TopNotch Music on September 9, 2016.

Critical reception

Allmusic editor Andy Kellman wrote that "as with his best work, Hollister carries himself with easy-going, modest certitude [...] Hollister is ideally matched with his supporting collaborators, with whom he made what he calls "a guide for men," though it does not come across as some grandly designed concept album. It's a simple, straightforward set that largely adheres to polished, soul-rooted R&B, with Hollister doling out advice and relating tales, inspired as ever by the likes of Sam Cooke and Bobby Womack, without pulpiting."

Track listing

Charts

References

2014 albums
Dave Hollister albums